Oneonta Theatre is a historic theatre building located at Oneonta in Otsego County, New York. The original structure was built about 1897 and expanded in several stages.  The original three story structure was a generally rectangular block with storefronts and theater entrance on the first floor and apartments above.  A theater wing projected from the rear was set at a 45-degree angle.  In 1922, the theater was expanded and the entrance relocated to the center of the building.  The 1922 marquee was removed in the 1970s.

It was listed on the National Register of Historic Places in 2002. It is located within the Oneonta Downtown Historic District established in 2003.

References

External links
Oneonta Theatre website
Cinema Treasures | Oneonta Theatre

Theatres on the National Register of Historic Places in New York (state)
Theatres completed in 1897
Buildings and structures in Otsego County, New York
National Register of Historic Places in Otsego County, New York
Individually listed contributing properties to historic districts on the National Register in New York (state)